Robson Caetano da Silva (born September 4, 1964 in Rio de Janeiro) is a Brazilian sprinter. He participated in four consecutive Olympic Summer Games (1984, 1988, 1992, 1996) and won the bronze medal over 200 metres in the 1988 Seoul Olympics as well as in the 4×100 m relay in the 1996 Atlanta Olympics.

Da Silva won three victories at World Cup competitions (1985, 1989, and 1992) over 200 m. He set two South American records over 100 metres and five over 200 m. In 1989, he was ranked No. 1 in the world with a time of 19.96 s over 200 m. His personal best of 10.00 makes him the fastest South American in history.

Regarding performance-enhancing drugs, Da Silva has stated he decided "not to take [them] and lose because it was a matter of character [and] dignity".

International competitions

1Representing the Americas
2Disqualified in the final
3Disqualified in the semifinals

References

External links

1964 births
Living people
Athletes from Rio de Janeiro (city)
Brazilian male sprinters
Olympic male sprinters
Olympic athletes of Brazil
Olympic bronze medalists for Brazil
Olympic bronze medalists in athletics (track and field)
Athletes (track and field) at the 1984 Summer Olympics
Athletes (track and field) at the 1988 Summer Olympics
Athletes (track and field) at the 1992 Summer Olympics
Athletes (track and field) at the 1996 Summer Olympics
Medalists at the 1988 Summer Olympics
Medalists at the 1996 Summer Olympics
Pan American Games athletes for Brazil
Pan American Games gold medalists for Brazil
Pan American Games silver medalists for Brazil
Pan American Games bronze medalists for Brazil
Pan American Games medalists in athletics (track and field)
Athletes (track and field) at the 1983 Pan American Games
Athletes (track and field) at the 1987 Pan American Games
Athletes (track and field) at the 1991 Pan American Games
Athletes (track and field) at the 1995 Pan American Games
Universiade gold medalists for Brazil
Universiade medalists in athletics (track and field)
Goodwill Games medalists in athletics
Competitors at the 1990 Goodwill Games
World Athletics Indoor Championships medalists
Japan Championships in Athletics winners
Medalists at the 1983 Pan American Games
Medalists at the 1987 Pan American Games
Medalists at the 1991 Pan American Games
20th-century Brazilian people